Muzik was a British dance music magazine published by IPC Media from June 1995 to August 2003.

Muzik was created by two former Melody Maker journalists, Push and Ben Turner. Push was the editor of Muzik from its launch until he left the magazine in 1998, at which point Turner took over as editor. The title was subsequently edited by Conor McNicholas, who went on to edit NME.

Aimed at serious dance music fans rather than weekend clubbers, Muziks writers included a number of well-known DJs, including Kris Needs, Rob da Bank, Spoony, Terry Farley, Bob Jones, Jonty Skrufff and Dave Mothersole. The magazine sold over 50,000 copies a month at its peak, but was closed down by IPC Media just one issue short of its 100th edition.

References

External links
Archives at Internet Archive
Muzik at Discogs

1995 establishments in the United Kingdom
2003 disestablishments in the United Kingdom
Dance music magazines
Defunct magazines published in the United Kingdom
Magazines disestablished in 2003
Magazines established in 1995
Magazines published in London
Monthly magazines published in the United Kingdom
Music magazines published in the United Kingdom